Promise You may refer to:
"Promise You" (Super Junior-K.R.Y song)
"Promise You", a song on the Kutless album To Know That You're Alive
"Promise You", a song by NCT 127 from their album Sticker